István Pásztor (born 20 August 1956) is a Serbian politician who has been the president of the Assembly of Vojvodina since 2012. An ethnic Hungarian, he has led the Alliance of Vojvodina Hungarians since 2008.

He graduated from the University of Novi Sad Faculty of Law. Currently, Pásztor is the chairman of the Alliance of Vojvodina Hungarians and president of the Assembly of Vojvodina. He was formerly a leader of the Hungarian Coalition, which also included two other ethnic Hungarian political parties in Serbia.

Pásztor was the candidate of the Hungarian Coalition in the 2008 Serbian presidential election. He won 2.26% of the vote in the first round, and supported Boris Tadić in the second round.

External links
 Hungarian Coalition

1956 births
Living people
Presidents of the Assembly of Vojvodina
Members of the Assembly of Vojvodina
Members of the Executive Council of Vojvodina
Government ministers of Vojvodina
Alliance of Vojvodina Hungarians politicians
University of Novi Sad alumni
People from Novi Kneževac
Hungarians in Vojvodina
Candidates for President of Serbia